Roy Spencer is a British actor and special effects technician who was born in Heanor, Derbyshire, but grew up in Eastwood, Nottinghamshire.

Trained at the Royal Academy of Dramatic Art, he became a member of the Royal Shakespeare Company for two seasons, during which he went with them on a Russian tour.

Spencer has appeared in several films and TV shows, including two roles in Doctor Who, as Manyak in The Ark and as Frank Harris in Fury from the Deep.

He also wrote several books about the author D. H. Lawrence and appeared in the BBC dramatisation of Lawrence's The Rainbow (1988).

Filmography

References

External links
 
cached article 'Loose Cannon's Hall Of Fame'
 Roy Spencer at Theatricalia

Year of birth missing (living people)
Living people
English male film actors
English male television actors
People from Eastwood, Nottinghamshire
People from Heanor
Royal Shakespeare Company members
Alumni of RADA